Loriot was the stage name of Vicco von Bülow (1923–2011), a German humorist, graphic artist, director, actor, and writer.

It may also refer to:

Surname 
 Anne-Marie Loriot (born 1956), Olympic Athlete
 Fernand Loriot (1870-1932), French pacifist and politician
 Guillaume Loriot (born 1986), French footballer
 Julien Loriot (1633–1715), French priest

Other 
 "Loriot", a British term for the game Diabolo
 Loriot (ship), a mid-19th-century American ship
 "Loriot", Great Western Railway telegraphic code for a machine truck

See also 
 Oriole, a family of birds known in French as loriots